Josef Kunt (4 June 1904 – 1982) was a Czech fencer. He competed in the individual and team épée events at the 1936 Summer Olympics.

References

1904 births
1982 deaths
Czech male fencers
Czechoslovak male fencers
Olympic fencers of Czechoslovakia
Fencers at the 1936 Summer Olympics